Turtleneck & Chain is the second studio album of the American comedy troupe The Lonely Island, whose members are Andy Samberg, Akiva Schaffer, and Jorma Taccone. The album was released on 10 May 2011 by Universal Republic Records. Turtleneck & Chain was nominated for the Grammy Award for Best Comedy Album. Many of the songs on the album were first performed on Saturday Night Live as SNL Digital Shorts ("I Just Had Sex", "Jack Sparrow", "Shy Ronnie 2: Ronnie & Clyde", "Motherlover", "The Creep", "Threw It on the Ground", "Reba (Two Worlds Collide)", and "Great Day"). "We're Back!" premiered on Late Night with Jimmy Fallon. The CD version of the album also includes a DVD featuring some of the digital shorts. Collaborators on the album include Snoop Dogg, Akon, Rihanna, Justin Timberlake, Nicki Minaj, Michael Bolton, Santigold, John Waters, and Beck.

Track listing

Samples
 "We're Back!" contains a sample from "That's How It Is" performed by Laura Lee.
 "Rocky" contains a sample from "I Feel Like Dynamite" performed by King Floyd.
 "Trouble on Dookie Island" contains a sample from "Minna Darekao Aishiteiru" performed by The Hornets.
 "No Homo" contains a sample from "I'm Not to Blame" performed by Bobby Byrd.
 "No Homo Outro" contains a sample from "Girls Can't Do What Guys Do" performed by Betty Wright.
 "Shy Ronnie 2: Ronnie & Clyde" contains a sample from "In My Hood" performed by P. Reign.
 "My Mic (Interlude)" interpolates lyrics from "My Mic Sounds Nice" by Salt-N-Pepa.

Charts

Weekly charts

Year-end charts

See also
 List of number-one rap albums of 2011 (U.S.)

References

Universal Republic Records albums
2011 albums
The Lonely Island albums
Albums produced by DJ Frank E
Albums produced by Ilya Salmanzadeh
Albums produced by T-Minus (record producer)
Albums produced by No I.D.
Albums produced by Stargate
2010s comedy albums